Andrew S. Chesney is an American politician who is an elected Republican member of the Illinois House of Representatives for the 89th district. The 89th district is located in the northwest corner of the state and includes all of Jo Daviess and Stephenson counties as well as parts of Ogle, Carroll, Winnebago, and Whiteside counties.

Chesney is the current Republican nominee for the 40th Illinois Senate District. He is also the Chairman of the Stephenson County Republican Central Committee. Prior to his election to the Illinois House of Representatives he was an Alderman-at-large in the City of Freeport, a member of the Stephenson County Convention and Visitors Bureau and a member of the Illinois WorkNet Center for Stephenson, Jo Daviess, and Winnebago counties.

After winning the 2018 general election, Chesney was appointed to succeed Brian W. Stewart for the remainder of the 100th General Assembly. Chesney was sworn into office December 5, 2018.

As of July 3, 2022, Representative Chesney is a member of the following Illinois House committees:

 Agriculture & Conservation Committee (HAGC)
 Cities & Villages Committee (HCIV)
 Counties & Townships Committee (HCOT)
 Housing Committee (SHOU)
 Labor & Commerce Committee (HLBR)
 Local Government Subcommittee (HCIV-LOCA)
 Minority Impact Analysis Subcommittee (HLBR-MIAS)
 Revenue & Finance Committee (HREF)
 Sales, Amusement, & Other Taxes Subcommittee (HREF-SATX)

Electoral history

References

External links
 Campaign website

Living people
21st-century American politicians
Arizona State University alumni
Illinois city council members
Democratic Party members of the Illinois House of Representatives
People from Freeport, Illinois
1982 births